Vadul lui Vodă is a town in the Chișinău municipality, Moldova. It is an eastern suburb of the capital of the country, and is well known as a resort.

The town is situated 23 km east of Chișinău on the right (western) bank of the Dniester river. During the Soviet era, several million tons of sand were brought in to create a wide artificial beach. Today it retains a small, mostly local, tourist trade.

Close to the town lies an airfield, popular for parachute jumping and general aviation.

The town day is celebrated on November 8.

References

Cities and towns in Chișinău Municipality
Cities and towns in Moldova
Populated places on the Dniester